Hernán Fredes (born 27 March 1987) is an Argentine football midfielder who plays for the Chacarita Juniors.

Career

Fredes made his professional debut in February 2006 and quickly established himself as an important member of the first team squad, playing in various positions including central and left midfielder and second striker.

On 7 July 2009 Ukrainian side Metallist signed the Argentine midfielder on loan from Independiente. He returned to Independiente in January 2010.

From the 2010–2011 season onwards, he became a determined player on the Independiente squad, winning the Copa Nissan Sudamericana 2010 for first time in club history. On 9 April 2011 he made a goal against Godoy Cruz at Independiente's stadium.

In June 2013, Fredes injured his knee. He was considered out of action for at least six months.

In 2014, he signed with Arsenal de Sarandí.

Honours
Independiente
Copa Sudamericana: 2010

References

External links
 
  
 Football-Lineups player profile
 
 

1987 births
Living people
Sportspeople from Avellaneda
Argentine footballers
Association football midfielders
Argentine Primera División players
Ukrainian Premier League players
Primera Nacional players
Paraguayan Primera División players
Primera B de Chile players
Club Atlético Independiente footballers
FC Metalist Kharkiv players
Arsenal de Sarandí footballers
Defensa y Justicia footballers
Club Atlético 3 de Febrero players
Club Sol de América footballers
Unión San Felipe footballers
Chacarita Juniors footballers
Argentine expatriate footballers
Expatriate footballers in Ukraine
Argentine expatriate sportspeople in Ukraine
Expatriate footballers in Paraguay
Argentine expatriate sportspeople in Paraguay
Expatriate footballers in Chile
Argentine expatriate sportspeople in Chile